South Korea competed at the 2005 World Championships in Athletics from August 6 to 14. A team of 10 athletes was announced in preparation for the competition.

Results

Men

Women

References
Result by Events.

External links
Official competition website

Nations at the 2005 World Championships in Athletics
World Championships in Athletics
2005